Motopark Academy (raced under Lotus moniker from 2012 to 2014) is an auto racing team based in Oschersleben, Germany, next to the Motorsport Arena Oschersleben race track. In 2013, the team competed in the GP2 Series under the name Russian Time and have operated a satellite team called CryptoTower Racing.

History

Single-seaters
The team have competed in open-wheel racing consistently since the start of the 21st century. They have competed in the Formula 3 Euro Series since 2009.

Eurocup Formula Renault 2.0
They were teams' champions in the Eurocup Formula Renault 2.0 in 2004, with their American driver Scott Speed taking the drivers' title with eight wins. Motopark Academy won the drivers' title of the 2006 Eurocup Formula Renault 2.0 season with Filipe Albuquerque, with the Portuguese driver collecting four wins in all.

Formula Renault 2.0 Northern European Cup
Motopark Academy have won all four Drivers' Championships in Formula Renault 2.0 Northern European Cup, since it formed in 2006. They won with Filipe Albuquerque in 2006, Frank Kechele in 2007, Valtteri Bottas in 2008 and António Félix da Costa in 2009. Motopark Academy also won the Teams' Championship of the Formula Renault 2.0 NEC three times: 2007, 2008 and 2009.

GP2 and GP3 Series
Russian Time was established by former Russian racing driver and manager Igor Mazepa and Motopark Academy team principal Timo Rumpfkeil in 2013. The team had sought an entry to the GP2 Series for two years before finally being accepted in 2013, replacing iSport International. iSport International withdrew from the series after being unable to secure a budget to compete in the upcoming season, and so its management elected to shut the team down in order to avoid bankruptcy.

The team won its first race in only its fourth appearance, when Sam Bird won the sprint race of the Bahrain round of the championship. The team took a second win on the streets of Monaco, with Bird finishing ahead of Kevin Ceccon after a fourteen-car pile-up on the opening lap forced nine drivers out of the race.

In 2014, the team was set to make their debut in GP3 Series, taking Bamboo Engineering's slot and continue to participate in GP2, German Formula Three and ADAC Formel Masters. The team's preparations for the 2014 season were disrupted by the death of Mazepa from complications relating to thrombosis in February 2014. On 18 February 2014, it was announced that Motopark had ended their partnership with Russian Time, leaving the position of all those drivers signed on for the 2014 GP2 and GP3 seasons, in limbo.

Formula 3 and Japanese single-seaters

In 2018, Motopark spent last season in the history of FIA Formula 3 European Championship with Jonathan Aberdein, Sebastián Fernández, Fabio Scherer, Marino Sato, Dan Ticktum and Jüri Vips.

Motopark is scheduled to make their debut in Japan in collaboration with the B-Max racing team, competing in Super Formula with Lucas Auer and Harrison Newey and Japanese Formula 3 with Sacha Fenestraz, Enaam Ahmed, 'Dragon' and Tairoku Yamaguchi. The team was also set to partake in the inaugural season of the Formula European Masters Championship reuniting with Sato and signing Red Bull Juniors Yuki Tsunoda and Liam Lawson, but the series ended up being cancelled due to a lack of entrants. In April 2019, it was announced Motopark would switch to the Euroformula Open Championship and retain its intended Formula European Masters line-up with Julian Hanses joining in a fourth car.

Current series results

Euroformula Open Championship

† Mansell drove for Carlin in round 3.

Former series results

GP2 Series

Formula 3 Euro Series

† Shared results with other teams

FIA Formula 3 International Trophy

FIA European Formula 3

† Includes points scored for Van Amersfoort Racing

Japanese Formula 3 Championship

ADAC Formula 4

Formula 4 UAE Championship

Super Formula

Super Formula Lights

Timeline

Footnotes

References

External links

 
 

German auto racing teams
Porsche Supercup teams
Formula Renault Eurocup teams
Formula 3 Euro Series teams
GP2 Series teams
1998 establishments in Germany
Auto racing teams established in 1998
British Formula Three teams
German Formula 3 teams
FIA Formula 3 European Championship teams
Euroformula Open Championship teams
Super Formula teams
Japanese Formula 3 Championship teams
International GT Open teams